Louise d'Aumont, duchesse d'Aumont, duchesse Mazarin et de La Meilleraye, (Louise Félicité Victoire; 22 October 1759, in Paris – 13 December 1826, in Paris) was a French Duchess and a Princess of Monaco by marriage to Honoré IV, Prince of Monaco.

Life

She was the only child and daughter of Louis Marie Guy d'Aumont, Duke of Aumont (1732–1799), and Louise Jeanne de Durfort, duchesse Mazarin et de La Meilleraye (Paris, 1 September 1735 - Paris, 17 March 1781).  Louise d'Aumont was a direct descendant of Hortense Mancini, the mistress of King Charles II of England, who was one of the two heirs of her uncle, King Louis XIV's chief minister Cardinal Mazarin. Also she was a descendant of Michel Le Tellier.

She married Honoré, Hereditary Prince of Monaco, on 15 July 1777 in Paris.  The couple had two children, Prince Honoré V and Prince Florestan I.  The marriage was arranged in order to give Monaco access to her great fortune.  However, her family's assets were tied up in lawsuits, and Louise went into debt in Monaco because of her gambling  and expensive wardrobe.  The marriage between Louise and Honoré was unhappy, and they soon separated.

In March 1793, Monaco was annexed to Revolutionary France, and the members of the former ruling dynasty became French citizens.  In parallel, her brother-in-law, Prince Joseph of Monaco spend most of his time abroad to negotiate foreign loans, making  him and his family suspect  of being contra-revolutionary traitors.  Joseph's wife Marie Thérèse de Choiseul was arrested in the absence of her spouse, as was his father, his brother and his sister-in-law, Louise.  Louise and her children where rescued from prison by her family doctor, Desormeaux, who forged a release order from prison and hid them until the fall of Maximilien Robespierre.

On 28 March 1794, Louise gave birth to an illegitimate daughter, Amélie Céleste Erodore d'Aumont (died 1820). The father of the child is believed to have been Antoine de Montazet, archbishop of Lyon.  The marriage of Honoré IV and Louise ended in divorce in 1798, giving Louise sole access of her fortune.  Louise married secondly René François Tirnand-d'Arcis on 6 February 1801, and divorced him in 1803.

Louise removed her eldest son from her will because he had an illegitimate child, and willed her entire fortune to her younger son, Florestan.   
Through their descent from Louise and her mother, the princely family of Monaco now lays claim to the wealth and estates bequeathed by Cardinal Mazarin, including the Duchy of Rethel, and the Principality of Château-Porcien.

Ancestry

References

 Monaco: 1662 to 1815 retrieved 8 February 2007
 World Roots retrieved 8 February 2007

Louise d'Aumont Mazarin
House of Grimaldi
1759 births
1826 deaths
Burials at the Cathedral of Our Lady Immaculate
Aumont, Duchess of, Louise
Hereditary Princesses of Monaco
Burials at Père Lachaise Cemetery
Dukes of Mayenne